"The Other" (original Spanish title: "El otro") is a 1972 short story by Argentine writer Jorge Luis Borges (1899-1986), collected in the anthology The Book of Sand (1975, English translation 1977).

Plot summary
A meeting between an older Borges and a younger Borges occurs in Cambridge, Massachusetts. In the dialogue that results, the young man refers to the novella The Double: A Petersburg Poem by Dostoevsky. While the younger man cites his romantic vision about a brotherhood of man, the older Borges reveals his doubt about the existence of a single man. Following incorrect information that the first provides, elder Borges concludes that it is a real episode for him, but a dream for the younger.

Short stories by Jorge Luis Borges
1972 short stories